Wasps of the cosmopolitan genus Polistes (the only genus in the tribe Polistini) are the most familiar of the polistine wasps, and are the most common type of paper wasp in North America. Walter Ebeling coined the vernacular name "umbrella wasps" for this genus in 1975 to distinguish it from other types of paper wasp, in reference to the form of their nests. It is also the single largest genus within the family Vespidae, with over 300 recognized species and subspecies. Their innate preferences for nest-building sites leads them to commonly build nests on human habitation, where they can be very unwelcome; although generally not aggressive, they can be provoked into defending their nests. All species are predatory, and they may consume large numbers of caterpillars, in which respect they are generally considered beneficial. The European paper wasp, Polistes dominula, was introduced into the US about 1981 and has quickly spread throughout most of the country, in most cases replacing native species within a few years. This species is very commonly mistaken for a yellow jacket, as it is black, strongly marked with yellow, and quite different from the native North American species of Polistes. The cuckoo wasp, Polistes semenowi, is an obligate social parasite, whose only host is P. dominula. Polistes metricus adults malaxate (malaxate means knead or rub [stuff] to make it soft) their insect prey by chewing them into a pulp, sucking out and ingesting the body fluids, then feeding the rest of the morsel to their larvae. The most widely distributed South American wasp species, Polistes versicolor, is particularly common in the southeastern Brazilian states. This social wasp is commonly referred to as the yellow paper wasp due to the distinct yellow bands found on its thorax and abdomen. Polistes wasps can be identified by their characteristic flight; their long legs dangle below their bodies, which are also more slender than a yellow jacket.

Description
As part of subfamily Polistinae, Polistes wasps are covered in short and inconspicuous hair, have a clypeus with a pointed apex, have a gena that is wide throughout, tergum 1 of the metasoma is almost straight to gently arched in profile, the tibia of the mid leg has two spurs, and the legs end in simple tarsal claws. The genus can be distinguished from other Polistinae by a sessile metasoma (the first segment at most slightly longer than wide) and the fourth tarsomeres of the mid and hind legs being symmetrical.

Polistes show sexual dimorphism, with males having seven externally visible metasomal segments whereas females have six. This trait is shared with other vespid wasps.

Polistes species have single-layered nests which are shaped like an umbrella, with the cells exposed to the air from the bottom, and no layer wrapping around the nest. The nests are suspended from a surface by a petiole and are constructed from a paper-like substance made of a mix of saliva and wood fibres chewed off old and soft wood or dead twigs. Many Polistes species in general often have nests supported by a longer petiole than those of Vespula.

Biochemistry
Similar to many insects, Carlson et al 1998 finds Polistes cuticular hydrocarbons to be predominantly many branched, methyl branched alkanes. The reviews of Nelson 1978, Lockey 1988 and Nelson 1993 concur.

Life cycle
The general life cycle of Polistes can be divided into four phases:
Founding (or pre-emergence) phase
Worker phase
Reproductive phase
Intermediate phase

Founding (or pre-emergence) phase
The founding stage begins in the spring when a solitary female (the "foundress") (or a small group of related females) initiates the construction of a nest. The wasps begin by fashioning a petiole, a short stalk which will connect the new nest to a substrate (often the eave of a house or outbuilding), and building a single brood cell at the end of it. Further cells are added laterally in a hexagonal pattern, each cell surrounded by six others. Although nests can achieve impressive sizes, they almost always maintain a basic shape: petiolated (stellocyttarous), single-combed, unprotected, and open (gymnodomous).

Eggs are laid by the foundress directly into the brood cells and are guarded by the foundress and the assisting females (if present). After the first larvae hatch, the foundress feeds them via progressive provisioning, bringing softened caterpillar flesh to the larvae multiple times throughout their development (as opposed to the one-time provisioning seen in some other hymenopteran groups). Each of this first seasonal brood of new paper wasps is exclusively female and destined to a subordinate worker position inside the nest; they do not found their own nests and instead assist their mother in the care and maintenance of future sisters.

Some foundress wasps do not build their own nests, but rather attempt to usurp that of another female. These usurpation attempts may or may not be successful, but almost always result in impressive displays of aggression and violence. Females may also adopt a more peaceful alternative reproduction strategy by joining the nest of a close relative (usually a sister) and working as assisting females. In the latter case, such cofounding females are generally, but not exclusively, close relatives.

Worker phase
The worker phase usually begins in the early summer, roughly two months after colony initiation, with the emergence of the first workers. These new females take up most of the colony's work duties, foraging, caring for brood, and maintaining the structure of the nest. Around this time, those females which assisted in nest foundation (if present) are driven from the nest by aggressive behavior on the part of the foundress, and leave either to start their own late-season nests or usurp another's.

Reproductive phase
The reproductive phase of the colony begins when the first female reproductives (the gynes) emerge from their brood cells. These reproductives differ from their worker sisters by having increased levels of fat stores and cryoprotectant carbohydrate compounds (allowing them to survive the overwintering period). These reproductives contribute genes directly to the next generation, while their worker sisters normally pass along their genes indirectly.

Intermediate phase
Once male reproductives emerge and both males and females disperse from the natal nest for mating flights, the so-called intermediate phase begins. Brood care and foraging behavior decline and worker numbers drop as dying individuals are no longer replaced by new ones. Intracolonial aggression increases and the social cohesion of the nest declines. In temperate Polistes species, individuals (almost exclusively inseminated females) gather in groups of up to 50 individuals and seek a sheltered location (called a hibernaculum) in which to overwinter.

Behavior

Kin selection

The reproductive behavior of Polistes wasps provided some of the first evidence for the mathematical biologist W. D. Hamilton's 1964 theory of kin selection. Hamilton showed that animals such as workers could be expected to provide assistance to relatives such as their queens according to the costs and benefits involved (K) and their degree of genetic relatedness (r), and gave the rule that now carries his name, K > 1/r. Early caution existed among researchers as to whether social insects could really assess their relatedness. Hamilton himself suggested an alternative possibility, namely that kin could become associated simply by "population viscosity"—that offspring tend not to disperse far from their birthplaces—and West-Eberhard (1969) found some evidence for this in Polistes. However, Polistes species are now known to learn and remember chemical signals (hydrocarbons) picked up from the nest to distinguish nestmates accurately from nonrelatives.

Dominance hierarchy system
Morphologically, the foundress and subordinate reproductive members of the colony differ little. However, behavioral differentiation occurs among females both between and within generations. For example, in the species Polistes humilis the queen displays a "tail-wagging" behavior to assert her dominance over the worker class. Similarly,  Polistes canadensis also possesses behavioral differentiation between the queen and her nestmates, with the queen often suppressing the aggressive behavior of subordinates through lateral abdominal vibrations and stroking. In contrast, unmated females are not aggressive. In Polistes exclamans queens have different amounts of glucose, fructose, and trehalose which lead to different cryoprotectant levels. This alters their survivability in different temperatures, increasing their odds of reproduction. Females in P. bellicosus are also morphologically similar between caste separations. For example, a P. bellicosus worker could become queen, and egg-layer, if all of the original foundresses die or leave the nest. This is also true for Polistes dorsalis, which also displays dominant behavior. Despite having no distinct morphological caste, roles of P. dorsalis tend to be fixed in a system with division of labor.

Nestmate recognition
Polistes spp. discriminate colony mates using an acquired (i.e. learned) cue, absorbing hydrocarbons from the natal nest at eclosion. This cuticular hydrocarbon "signature" is derived both from the plant material and the foundress-applied substances from which the nest is made. Studies of Polistes fuscatus have researched the molecular basis of the recognition "pheromone" used by the wasps, and indicate at least some of the recognizable labels have the same chemical constituents as the adult cuticular hydrocarbons. Similar recognition is found in Polistes metricus.

Dominant individuals of P. dominula have differing cuticular profiles from workers, and the frequent observations of the dominant female stroking its gaster across the nest surface, combined with its staying on the nest for longer times than subordinates, suggests the dominant individual may contribute more to the nest odor.

P. carolina females do not preferentially feed their own progeny (as larvae), so it may be the case that nest odor only serves as a likely indicator of relatedness, rather than a specific label of kinship.

Further to this recognition of nestmates, Polistes biglumis foundresses discriminate between 'alien' eggs and their own via differential oophagy.
The mechanism of differentiation is not elucidated, but is thought to be based upon differences in cuticular hydrocarbon odor.

Gallery

Species
New species continue to be described in the genus. There are nine species in Europe.

Polistes actaeon
Polistes adelphus
Polistes adustus
Polistes affinis
Polistes africanus
Polistes albicinctus
Polistes albocalcaratus
Polistes angulinus
Polistes angusticlypeus
Polistes annularis
Polistes apachus
Polistes apicalis
Polistes aquilinus
Polistes arizonensis
Polistes arthuri
Polistes assamensis
Polistes associus
Polistes asterope
Polistes aterrimus
Polistes atrimandibularis
Polistes atrox
Polistes aurifer
Polistes austroccidentalis
Polistes badius
Polistes bahamensis
Polistes balder
Polistes bambusae
Polistes bellicosus
Polistes bequaertellus
Polistes bequaerti
Polistes bequaertianus
Polistes bicolor
Polistes biglumis
Polistes biguttatus
Polistes billardieri
Polistes binotatus
Polistes bischoffi
Polistes bituberculatus
Polistes boharti
Polistes brevifissus
Polistes brunus
Polistes buruensis
Polistes buyssoni
Polistes callimorphus
Polistes canadensis
Polistes candidoi
Polistes capnodes
Polistes carnifex
Polistes carolina
Polistes cavapyta
Polistes cavapytiformis
Polistes chinensis
Polistes cinerascens
Polistes claripennis
Polistes clavicornis
Polistes comanchus
Polistes consobrinus
Polistes contrarius
Polistes crinitus
Polistes cubensis
Polistes davillae
Polistes dawnae
Polistes deceptor
Polistes defectivus
Polistes delhiensis
Polistes diabolicus
Polistes diakonovi
Polistes dominicus
Polistes dominula
Polistes dorsalis
Polistes ebsohinus
Polistes eburneus
Polistes elegans
Polistes ellenbergi
Polistes ephippium
Polistes erythrinus
Polistes erythrocephalus
Polistes exclamans
Polistes extraneus
Polistes facilis
Polistes fastidiosus
Polistes ferreri
Polistes flavobilineatus
Polistes flavus
Polistes fordi
Polistes formosanus
Polistes franciscanus
Polistes fuscatus
Polistes gallicus
Polistes geminatus
Polistes gigas
Polistes goeldii
Polistes haugi
Polistes hebridensis
Polistes helveticus
Polistes hirsuticornis
Polistes horrendus
Polistes huacapistana
Polistes huisunensis
Polistes humilis
Polistes incertus
Polistes indicus
Polistes infuscatus
Polistes instabilis
Polistes intermedius
Polistes iranus
Polistes japonicus
Polistes jokahamae
Polistes kaibabensis
Polistes khasianus
Polistes laevigatissimus
Polistes lanio
Polistes lateritius
Polistes latinis
Polistes legnotus
Polistes lepcha
Polistes lineonotus
Polistes loveridgei
Polistes lycus
Polistes macrocephalus
Polistes madecassus
Polistes madiburensis
Polistes major
P. m. major
Polistes mandarinus
Polistes maranonensis
Polistes marginalis
Polistes maroccanus
Polistes meadeanus
Polistes melanopterus
Polistes melanosoma
Polistes melanotus
Polistes mertoni
Polistes metricus
Polistes mexicanus
Polistes minor
Polistes mongolicus
Polistes moraballi
Polistes myersi
Polistes mysteriosus
Polistes niger
Polistes nigrifrons
Polistes nigritarsis
Polistes nimpha
Polistes ninabamba
Polistes nipponensis
Polistes notatipes
Polistes obscurus
Polistes occipitalis
Polistes occultus
Polistes oculatus
Polistes olivaceus
Polistes opacus
Polistes ornatus
Polistes pacificus
Polistes palmarum
Polistes paraguayensis
Polistes parametricus
Polistes penai
Polistes penthicus
Polistes perflavus
Polistes peruvianus
Polistes philippinensis
Polistes poeyi
Polistes praenotatus
Polistes pseudoculatus
Polistes quadricingulatus
Polistes ridleyi
Polistes riekii
Polistes riparius
Polistes rossi
Polistes rothneyi
Polistes rubellus
Polistes rubiginosus
Polistes rufidens
Polistes rufiventris
Polistes rufodorsalis
Polistes sagittarius
Polistes santoshae
Polistes satan
Polistes saussurei
Polistes schach
Polistes semenowi
Polistes semiflavus
Polistes sgarambus
Polistes shirakii
Polistes sikorae
Polistes similis
Polistes simillimus
Polistes simulatus
Polistes smithii
Polistes snelleni
Polistes stabilinus
Polistes stenopus
Polistes stigma
Polistes strigosus
Polistes subsericeus
Polistes takasagonus
Polistes tenebricosus
Polistes tenellus
Polistes tenuispunctia
Polistes tepidus
Polistes testaceicolor
Polistes thoracicus
Polistes torresae
Polistes tristis
Polistes tullgreni
Polistes utakwae
Polistes variabilis
Polistes veracrucis
Polistes versicolor
Polistes wattii
Polistes watutus
Polistes weyrauchorum
Polistes williamsi
Polistes xanthogaster
Polistes xantholeucus

Pest status

Along with the German and common wasps, the Asian and Australian paper wasps (P. chinensis and P. humilis) are considered pests in New Zealand. Arriving in 1979, the Asian paper wasp has established itself in both the North Island and the northern parts of the South Island. Because it competes with native species (such as the kaka) for insects, nectar, and honeydew, it is a hindrance to conservation efforts.

Parasites
Various other insects are parasites or parasitoids of Polistes, including flies (e.g., Sarcophagidae), mantispids, and wasps in the families Torymidae, Mutillidae (rarely), Braconidae, and Ichneumonidae (e.g. Latibulus argiolus). Some more specialized groups are more intimately associated with Polistes; this includes strepsipterans in the family Stylopidae (genus Xenos), wasps of the genus Elasmus (formerly placed in their own family, "Elasmidae"), and wasps in the family Trigonalidae.

The nests of many species of this wasp genus are invaded by the parasitoid caterpillars of the moth Chalcoela iphitalis which feed on the wasp larvae and pupas at night, spinning their cocoons in empty cells.

Within the subgenus Polistes are four known social obligate parasites: P. atrimandibularis, P. austroccidentalis, P. maroccanus, and P. semenowi, which parasitize other Polistes wasps. Known host species of these parasites are P. dominulus, P. gallicus, P. nimphus, P. associus, and P. biglumis. Although these parasites differ in their host invasion strategies, their end goal is to successfully infiltrate the host nest and reproduce at the host's expense.

References

Further reading

External links
Paper wasp Polistes dominula reference photographs, descriptions, taxonomy
Paper wasp Polistes fuscatus diagnostic photographs, natural history
 Polistes dominula facial markings indicating dominance
Red wasps from www.whyistheanswer.com

 
Insects used as insect pest control agents
Hymenoptera genera
Taxa named by Pierre André Latreille